Breakfast at Tiffany's is a 1961 American romantic comedy film directed by Blake Edwards, written by George Axelrod, adapted from Truman Capote's 1958 novella of the same name, and starring Audrey Hepburn as Holly Golightly, a naïve, eccentric café society girl who falls in love with a struggling writer. It was theatrically released by Paramount Pictures on October 5, 1961, to critical and commercial success.

Nominated for five Academy Awards (winning two), with the music (including "Moon River") nominated for six Grammy Awards (winning five), the film was selected in 2012 for preservation in the United States National Film Registry by the Library of Congress as being "culturally, historically or aesthetically significant".

Plot

Early one morning, a taxi pulls up in front of the Tiffany & Co. flagship store and from it emerges elegantly dressed Holly Golightly, carrying a paper bag containing her breakfast. After looking into the store's window displays, she strolls to her apartment and has to fend off her date from the night before. 

Once inside, Holly cannot find her keys, so she buzzes her landlord, Mr. Yunioshi, to let her in. Later, she is awakened by new neighbor Paul Varjak, who rings her doorbell to get into the building. The pair chat as she dresses to leave for her weekly visit to mobster Sally Tomato, who is currently incarcerated at Sing Sing. Tomato's lawyer pays her $100 a week to deliver "the weather report".

As she is leaving, Holly is introduced to Paul's "decorator", wealthy older woman Emily Eustace Failenson, whom Paul nicknames "2E". That night, when Holly goes out onto the fire escape to elude an over-eager date, she peeks into Paul's apartment and sees 2E leaving money and kissing him goodbye. 

Visiting Paul afterward, she learns he is a writer who has not had anything published since a book of vignettes five years before. Holly, in turn, explains she is trying to save money to support her brother Fred after he completes his Army service. The pair fall asleep but are awakened when Holly has a nightmare about her brother. When Paul questions her about this, Holly chides him for prying. 

Holly later buys Paul a typewriter ribbon to apologize and invites him to a wild party at her apartment. There, he meets her Hollywood agent, who describes Holly's transformation from a country girl into a Manhattan socialite, along with wealthy Brazilian politician José da Silva Pereira, and Rusty Trawler, the "ninth richest man in America under 50".

Some time later, 2E enters Paul's apartment, worried she is being followed. Paul tells her he will investigate and eventually confronts Holly's husband, Doc Golightly, who explains that Holly's real name is Lula Mae Barnes and that they were married when she was approaching 14. Now he wants to take her back to rural Texas. After Paul reunites Holly and Doc, she informs Paul that the marriage was annulled. At the Greyhound bus station, she tells Doc she will not return with him, and he leaves broken-hearted.

After drinking at a club, Paul and Holly return to her apartment, where she drunkenly tells him that she plans to marry Trawler for his money.  A few days later, Paul learns that one of his short stories will be published. On the way to tell Holly, he sees a newspaper headline stating that Trawler has married someone else. 

Holly and Paul agree to spend the day together, taking turns doing things each has never done before.  At Tiffany's, he has the ring from Doc Golightly's box of Cracker Jack engraved as a present for her. After spending the night together, Paul awakens to find Holly gone. When 2E arrives, he ends their affair. She calmly accepts, having earlier concluded that he was in love with someone.

Holly now schemes to marry José for his money, but after receiving a telegram notifying her of her brother's death in a jeep accident, she trashes her apartment. Months later, she invites Paul to dinner, as she is leaving the next morning for Brazil to continue her relationship with José. However, the pair are arrested in connection with Sally Tomato's drug ring, and Holly spends the night in jail.

The next morning, Hollywood friend O.J. Berman pays Holly's bail. Paul is waiting for her in a cab, bringing her pet, "Cat", and a letter from José explaining that he must end their relationship due to her arrest. Holly insists that she will go to Brazil anyway; she asks the cab to pull over and pushes Cat out into the pouring rain. Just after they get underway again, Paul storms out of the cab, tossing the engraved ring into her lap and telling her to examine her life. 

Holly goes through a decision-making moment, puts on the ring and runs after Paul, who has gone looking for Cat. Finally, Holly finds Cat sheltering in an alley and, with him tucked into her coat, she and Paul embrace.

Cast

Production

Pre-production
The Oscar-nominated screenplay was written by George Axelrod, loosely based on the novella by Truman Capote. Changes were made to fit the medium of cinema and to correspond to the filmmakers' vision. Capote, who sold the film rights of his novella to Paramount Studios, wanted Marilyn Monroe to play Holly Golightly, whom he had described perfectly in the book. Barry Paris cites Capote's own comments on the choice of actress: "Marilyn was always my first choice to play the girl, Holly Golightly." Screenwriter Axelrod was hired to "tailor the screenplay for Monroe". When Lee Strasberg advised Monroe that playing a "lady of the evening" would be bad for her image, she turned it down and performed in The Misfits instead. When Hepburn was cast instead of Monroe, Capote remarked: "Paramount double-crossed me in every way and cast Audrey". Shirley MacLaine was also offered the part of Holly, but she turned it down and performed in Two Loves instead. Kim Novak also turned down the role of Holly. Hepburn was hesitant to be cast in the film as her character was would go against who she was. Steve McQueen was offered the role of Paul Varjak, but declined the offer due to being under contract. Jack Lemmon was also approached but he was unavailable. Robert Wagner was also considered.

Axelrod worked with the original director of the film John Frankenheimer for a period of three months, but Hepburn's agent wanted a more known director, with the result that Frankenheimer was removed from the project.

Principal photography

Filming began on Fifth Avenue outside the Tiffany & Co. flagship store on October 2, 1960. Most of the exteriors were filmed in New York City, and all of the interiors, except for portions of the scene inside Tiffany & Company, were filmed on the Paramount Studios lot in Hollywood.

According to one report, the film's on-location opening sequence, in which Holly gazes into a Tiffany's display window, was extremely difficult for director Blake Edwards to shoot. Although it was simple in concept, crowd control, Hepburn's dislike of pastries, and an accident that nearly resulted in the electrocution of a crew member are all said to have made capturing the scene a challenge. However, another report claims that the sequence was captured rather quickly due to the good fortune of an unexpected traffic lull.

Music

During the film, Hepburn sang the film's signature song, "Moon River" by Henry Mancini and Johnny Mercer. The song was tailored to Hepburn's limited vocal range, based on songs she had performed in 1957's Funny Face. On the Anniversary Edition DVD of Breakfast at Tiffany's, co-producer Dick Shepherd says in his audio commentary that after a preview in San Francisco, Martin Rankin, Paramount's head of production, wanted "Moon River" replaced with music by somebody else but "Marty [Jurow, co-producer] and I both said 'over our dead bodies,'" – a remark attributed to Hepburn herself in another account.

According to Time magazine, Mancini "sets off his melodies with a walking bass, extends them with choral and string variations, varies them with the brisk sounds of combo jazz. 'Moon River' is sobbed by a plaintive harmonica, repeated by strings, hummed and then sung by the chorus, finally resolved with the harmonica again."

The soundtrack featured a score composed and conducted by Henry Mancini, with songs by Mancini and lyricist Johnny Mercer. Mancini and Mercer won the 1961 Oscar for Best Original Song for "Moon River". Mancini won for Best Original Score. There are also unreleased score pieces from Breakfast at Tiffany's in existence; "Carousel Cue" is from an unsurfaced scene, while "Outtake 1" is from a deleted scene in which Holly and Fred visit Tiffany's and is a variation of the main theme. In 2013 Intrada released the complete score in its original film performance (as with many soundtrack albums by Mancini and others at the time, the album released alongside the film was a re-recording).

Reception
Breakfast at Tiffany's was theatrically released by Paramount Pictures on October 5, 1961, to critical and commercial success, grossing $14 million on a $2.5 million budget. Hepburn's portrayal of Holly Golightly is generally considered to be one of her most memorable and identifiable roles. She regarded it as one of her most challenging roles, since she was an introvert required to play an extrovert.

The film received five nominations at the 34th Academy Awards; Best Actress (for Hepburn), Best Adapted Screenplay, Best Production Design, winning Best Original Score and Best Original Song for "Moon River". It was considered "culturally, historically or aesthetically" significant by the U.S. Library of Congress and selected to be preserved in the National Film Registry in 2012.

On review aggregator Rotten Tomatoes, the film has an approval rating of 89% based on 55 reviews, with an average score of 7.50/10. The website's critical consensus reads, "It contains some ugly anachronisms, but Blake Edwards is at his funniest in this iconic classic, and Audrey Hepburn absolutely lights up the screen." On Metacritic, the film has a weighted average score of 76 out of 100 based on 6 critics, indicating "generally favorable reviews".

Critical response
Time magazine noted "for the first half hour or so, Hollywood's Holly (Audrey Hepburn) is not much different from Capote's. She has kicked the weed and lost the illegitimate child she was having, but she is still jolly Holly, the child bride from Tulip, Texas, who at 15 runs away to Hollywood to find some of the finer things of life—like shoes."  It pointed out that "after that out-of-Capote beginning, director Blake Edwards ... goes on to an out-of-character end."  Almost a half century later, Time commented on the pivotal impact of Hepburn's portrayal of Golightly:

The New York Times called the film a "completely unbelievable but wholly captivating flight into fancy composed of unequal dollops of comedy, romance, poignancy, funny colloquialisms and Manhattan's swankiest East Side areas captured in the loveliest of colors". In reviewing the performances, the newspaper said Holly Golightly is

Truman Capote hated Hepburn in the lead part. Capote biographer Gerald Clarke deemed the film a "valentine" to free-spirited women rather than a cautionary tale about a little girl lost in the big city. "The movie is a confection — a sugar and spice confection."

Influence

Hepburn as Holly, with her hair in a high chignon and carrying an oversized cigarette holder, is considered one of the most iconic images of 20th century American cinema. Another iconic item throughout the movie is Holly's sunglasses. Often misidentified as Ray-Ban, they are Manhattan sunglasses designed and manufactured in London by Oliver Goldsmith. In 2011 the model was re-released to mark the 50th anniversary of Breakfast at Tiffany's. One of three dresses designed by Givenchy for Hepburn for possible use in the film sold at auction by Christie's on December 5, 2006, for £467,200 (~US$947,000), about seven times the reserve price. The "Little Black Dress" by Givenchy, worn by Hepburn in the beginning of the film, is cited as one of the most iconic items of clothing in the history of the twentieth century and is, perhaps, the most famous little black dress of all time. A second "little black dress" in Breakfast at Tiffany's, along with its wide-brimmed hat, was worn by Hepburn as Holly when she goes to visit mobster Sally Tomato at Sing Sing Prison. This dress was paid homage as one of the dresses worn by Anne Hathaway's character Selina Kyle, Catwoman's alter ego, in Christopher Nolan's The Dark Knight Rises; the comic book Catwoman drawn by artist Adam Hughes, was based on Hepburn, creating a double homage to Hepburn's Holly Golightly in Hathaway's Catwoman.

The film rejuvenated the career of 1930s movie song-and-dance man and Disney Davy Crockett sidekick Buddy Ebsen, who had a small but effective role in this film as Doc Golightly, Holly's ex-husband. His success here led directly to his best-known role as Jed Clampett on The Beverly Hillbillies.

A diamond necklace at Tiffany's that Hepburn scorned as too flashy was the Tiffany Yellow Diamond, which she wore in publicity photos for the film. Tiffany's profile as a pre-eminent luxury retailer, while already established, was further boosted by the film.

Portrayal of Mr. Yunioshi and later yellowface controversy

For his portrayal of I. Y. Yunioshi, Mickey Rooney wore makeup and a prosthetic mouthpiece to change his features to a caricatured approximation of a Japanese man. Since the 1990s, this portrayal has been subject to increasing protest by Asian Americans, among others. For instance, in the film Dragon: The Bruce Lee Story (1993), Breakfast at Tiffany's is used as an illustration of Hollywood's racist depiction of Asian people when Bruce Lee and his future wife, Linda, see the film and Linda suggests they leave when she notices that Bruce is upset at Rooney's caricatured performance.

In his audio commentary for the DVD release, producer Richard Shepherd said that at the time of production as well as in retrospect, he wanted to recast the role "not because he [Rooney] didn't play the part well" but because Shepherd thought the part of Mr. Yunioshi should be performed by an actor of Japanese ethnicity; it was director Blake Edwards' decision to keep Rooney.  In a "making-of" for the 45th anniversary edition DVD release, Shepherd repeatedly apologizes, saying, "If we could just change Mickey Rooney, I'd be thrilled with the movie." Director Blake Edwards stated, "Looking back, I wish I had never done it ... and I would give anything to be able to recast it, but it's there, and onward and upward."

In a 2008 interview about the film, 87-year-old Rooney said he was heartbroken about the criticism:

Rooney also said that if he had known the portrayal would have offended people so much, "I wouldn't have done it. Those that didn't like it, I forgive them and God bless America, God bless the universe, God bless Japanese, Chinese, Indians, all of them and let's have peace."

The film continues to draw criticism for this character, now widely considered to be a racist caricature, particularly when the movie is selected as a "classic" screened in public spaces, supported by tax dollars. In 2011, a SyFy and  Brooklyn Bridge Park Corporation screening inspired petitions.

Film historian and Turner Classic Movies host Robert Osborne stated in a Q&A that he would recast Rooney from the picture saying, "that was such a racial slur, out of nowhere, and I blame Blake Edwards for that decision, the caricature was totally embarrassing".

Awards and honors

 American Film Institute ranked the film No. 61 in 100 Years ... 100 Passions and "Moon River" as No. 4 in 100 Years ... 100 Songs.
 The film was ranked No. 486 on Empires The 500 Greatest Movies of All Time list for 2008.

Home media

Breakfast at Tiffany's was one of the first Hepburn films to be released to the home video market in the early 1980s, and is also widely available on DVD. On February 7, 2006, Paramount released a 45th anniversary special edition DVD set in North America with featurettes not included on the prior DVD release:
 Audio Commentary – with producer Richard Shepherd
 Breakfast at Tiffany's: The Making of a Classic – a making-of featurette with interviews by Edwards, Neal, the "laughing/crying" woman from the party, and Sean Ferrer, Hepburn's son.
 It's So Audrey! A Style Icon – a short tribute to Hepburn.
 Brilliance in a Blue Box – a brief history of Tiffany & Co.
 Audrey's Letter to Tiffany – an accounting of Hepburn's letter to Tiffany & Co. on the occasion of the company's 150th anniversary in 1987.
 Original Theatrical Trailer
 Photo Gallery

On January 13, 2009, a remastered Centennial Collection version of the film was released. In addition to the special features on the 45th anniversary edition, this version includes:
 A Golightly Gathering – Reuniting some of the past cast members from the party with interviews on their experiences filming that segment.
 Henry Mancini: More Than Music – A featurette about Henry Mancini, "Moon River" and interviews with Mancini's wife and children.
 Mr. Yunioshi: An Asian Perspective – Documentary discussing the reaction and Asian perspective of the character of Mr. Yunioshi, one of the most controversial characters in film.
 Behind the Gates – A tour through Paramount Studios

In 2011 a newly remastered HD version of the film was released on Blu-ray with many of the features from the aforementioned DVDs. The digital restoration of the film was done by Paramount Pictures.  The digital pictures were frame by frame digitally restored at Prasad Corporation to remove dirt, tears, scratches and other artifacts. The film was restored to its original look for its 50th Anniversary.

Stage adaptations
In 2004, a musical adaptation of the film made its world debut at The Muny in St. Louis.

In May 2009, Anna Friel starred in a London adaptation that opened in September 2009 at the Haymarket Theatre.

A new stage adaption made its debut in March 2013 at the Cort Theater in New York City with Emilia Clarke in the role of Holly Golightly.

See also

 Male prostitution in the arts
 Portrayal of East Asians in Hollywood
 Whitewashing in film
 List of Academy Award-winning films
 List of American films of 1961
 List of Audrey Hepburn credits
 List of comedy films of the 1960s
 List of films set in New York City
 List of Paramount Pictures films
 List of short fiction made into feature films

References

Further reading 
 
 Breakfast at Tiffany's, by George Axelrod. Published by Paramount Home Entertainment (UK), 1960. (film script)
 Breakfast at Tiffany's: A Short Novel and Three Stories, by Truman Capote. Published by Random House, 1958.

External links

 
 
 
 
 
 Breakfast at Tiffany's full movie on Youtube 

1961 films
1961 comedy-drama films
1961 romantic comedy films
1960s romantic comedy-drama films
1960s English-language films
American romantic comedy-drama films
Films about interclass romance
Films about social class
Films about writers
Films based on novellas
Films based on works by Truman Capote
Films directed by Blake Edwards
Films scored by Henry Mancini
Films set in apartment buildings
Films set in New York City
Films shot in New York City
Films that won the Best Original Score Academy Award
Films that won the Best Original Song Academy Award
Films with screenplays by George Axelrod
Paramount Pictures films
Race-related controversies in film
Casting controversies in film
United States National Film Registry films
1960s American films